The Geely Yuanjing X6 is a compact crossover produced by Chinese auto maker Geely. Originally launched as the GLEagle GX7 under the GLEagle brand and Shanghai Englon SX7 under the Shanghai Englon brand of Geely, the crossover was relaunched as the Geely GX7 after the GLEagle brand was discontinued, and in 2016, a major facelift updated the vehicle name to Vision X6 or Yuanjing X6 as the flagship of the Geely Vision crossover series.

Geely GLEagle GX7/ Geely GX7

In 2012 the Geely GLEagle GX7 was launched, and it was officially introduced to the market on March 3, 2014. When the GLEagle sub-brand was shut down in 2015, the name was then changed to Geely GX7.

Powertrain
The engines offered on the Geely GLEagle GX7 and Geely GX7 is a 1.8 liter inline-4 engine producing 133hp, a 1.8 liter inline-4 engine producing 139hp, and a 2.0 liter inline-4 engine producing 141hp with a 6-speed automatic transmission.

Geely Yuanjing X6/ Geely Yuanjing SUV 

In 2016, Geely conducted a major facelift on the model and changed its name again to Vision X6 or Yuanjing X6. The facelift updated the front DRG and mainly the grilles of the Yuanjing SUV to be inline with the rest of the Geely products, while the name change now places the model as part of the Yuanjing product series and the Yuanjing X6/SUV now stands above the Yuanjing X3 and Yuanjing X1 crossovers.

Powertrain
The engines offered on the Geely Yuanjing X6 is a 1.3 liter turbo inline-4 engine producing 133hp mated to a CVT, and the 1.8 liter inline-4 engine producing 139hp from the pre-facelift model mated to a 5-speed manual gearbox.

2020 facelift
As of October 2019, images of the Geely Yuanjing X6 facelift was revealed featuring a slightly restyled front fascia, a completely redesigned rear and black Geely badges. The updated model has a vehicle length of 4,546mm, a width of 1,834mm, and a height of 1,515mm, and the wheelbase is 2,661mm. Power comes from a 1.4 liter turbo engine producing a maximum power of 141 PS and a torque of 235Nm.

2021 Yuanjing X6 Pro

References

Yuanjing SUV
Compact sport utility vehicles
Front-wheel-drive vehicles
Hatchbacks
Cars introduced in 2009
Cars of China
2010s cars